Swarag Se Sunder is a 1986 Hindi-language drama film, produced by  A. Krishna Murthy under the Tinu International Films banner and directed  by K. Bapaiah. It stars Jeetendra, Mithun Chakraborty, Jaya Prada, Padmini Kolhapure, and music composed by Laxmikant–Pyarelal. The primary plot of the movie is similar to Meri Bhabhi (1969) directed by Khalid Akhtar. The film is a remake of the Telugu film Thalli Prema.

Plot
The film begins in a village where the honorable Sarpanch Vijay Kumar Chowdary (Jeetendra) lives with his wife Lakshmi (Jayaprada) and younger brother Ravi (Mithun Chakraborty) one that adores them. As Vijay toiled to improve the village, Lakshmi is overseen as a result they are childless. Besides, Milavat Ram (Kader Khan) own a grocery store and makes malpractice when Vijay starts up a government store that begrudges him. Meanwhile, Pannalal (Prem Chopra) the brother-in-law of Milavat Ram also avenged against Vijay as he performed his son's marriage without his knowledge. Meanwhile, Ravi loves and marries Lalita (Padmini Kolhapure) the benevolent daughter of Milavat Ram. Anyway, Lakshmi and Lalita are cordial and they build a jaunty world. They have a baby boy, but awfully, Lalita goes miscarriage. During that plight, Vijay and Lakshmi substitute their baby for Lalita's and Ravi does not know this. Thereafter, discords divide the family. Exploiting it, Milavat Ram and Pannalal force Ravi for his share which he refuses but Lalita prompts. Listening to it, Vijay collapses, totally surrenders to Ravi, and quits. At present, Ravi is angry at Lalita, afterward, learns that she was coerced by Pannalal via seizing kid. Thereupon, Vijay and Ravi ceases Pannalal, safeguard the boy, and further Milavat Ram pleads pardon. At last, Ravi and Lalita affirm that they knew the truth and return the child to Vijay and Lakshmi and the movie ends happily.

Cast
Jeetendra as Vijay Choudhary
Mithun Chakraborty as Ravi Choudhary
Jaya Prada as Laxmi Choudhury
Padmini Kolhapure as Lalita Choudhary
Prem Chopra as Pannalal
Kader Khan as Milawatram
Asrani as Meowalal Kannu Saraswat
Satyendra Kapoor as Rahim Chacha
Bharat Bhushan as Dr. Shiraz
Shoma Anand	
Aruna Irani as Phoolmati
Shubha Khote as Bandharlekha
Neeta Mehta as Dr. Leelavathi
Kartar Singh Sikh man in the village crowd

Soundtrack

The music for the film was composed by Laxmikant–Pyarelal.

References

External links
 

1986 films
1980s Hindi-language films
Indian drama films
Films directed by K. Bapayya
Films scored by Laxmikant–Pyarelal
Hindi remakes of Telugu films
1986 drama films
Hindi-language drama films